About Last Night is an EP by New Buffalo, released on 10 September 2001.

Track listing
 "16 Beats" – 3:32
 "About Last Night" – 4:33
 "Home" – 3:26
 "This Is More" – 3:25
 "Just a Little Time" – 4:06

2001 EPs
Sally Seltmann albums